The 1985 Cal State Northridge  Matadors football team represented California State University, Northridge as a member of the Western Football Conference (WFC) during the 1985 NCAA Division II football season. Led by Tom Keele in his seventh and final season as head coach, Cal State Northridge compiled an overall record of 4–7 with a mark of 1–4 in conference play, tying for fifth place in the WFC. The team was outscored by its opponents 339 to 281 for the season. The Matadors played home games at North Campus Stadium in Northridge, California.

Schedule

Team players in the NFL
No Cal State Northridge players were selected in the 1986 NFL Draft.

The following finished their college career in 1985 were not drafted, but played in the NFL.

References

Cal State Northridge
Cal State Northridge Matadors football seasons
Cal State Northridge Matadors football